Puli Hisar or Pul-e-Hesar is a district in Baghlan province, Afghanistan.

History
It was created in 2005 from part of Andarab District. 

The district was captured by the Taliban in the 2021 offensive in which they seized control of Afghanistan. However, in August 2021, the district was one of three districts in Baghlan province that were occupied by anti-Taliban fighters (remnants of the Afghan National Army and civilian resistance fighters), marking the first wave of armed resistance to the Taliban since they seized control over the country. The other areas in which the Taliban were ousted were Dih Salah and Bano.

On 23 August 2021, the Taliban once again captured all three districts that fell to the resistance forces a week ago, including Puli Hisar District. However, CNN reported on 31 August 2021 that resistance fighters had once again entered Puli Hisar.

Geography
Puli Hisar District is bordered on the north by the districts of Dih Salah and Khost Wa Fereng, on the east by Panjshir Province, on the south by Panjshir and Parwan provinces, and on the west by Andarab District.  

There are no towns in the district, nor any large-sized villages. Settlements include the small villages of Darae Su (Darah-ye Shū), Ahangaran, and Sar Ab.

The area is mountaineous, lying within the Hindu Kush.

The main stream in the district is the Darwāza (Darah-ye Darwāzah), and most of the villages lie along its banks, or those of its tributaries.

Climate
According to the Köppen climate classification, Puli Hisar has a warm-summer humid continental climate (Dsb) bordering closely on a subarctic climate (Dsc), with mild summers and cold, snowy winters.

Economy
Puli Hisar is one of Baghlan's main opium poppy cultivating districts.

References

Districts of Baghlan Province